Becker is an American situation comedy series which aired on CBS. Running for six seasons from 1998 to 2004, the show consists of 129 episodes (including the pilot). The number of every episode appears as the change readout on the register at Reggie's diner.

Series overview

Episodes

Season 1 (1998–99)

Season 2 (1999–2000)

Season 3 (2000–01)

Season 4 (2001–02)

Season 5 (2002–03)

Season 6 (2003–04)

External links 
 
 CBS Television Distribution Syndication Bible – where production order comes from

Becker